George Carson may refer to:

George Carson (footballer) (born 1925), Scottish footballer
George Carson (trade unionist) (1848–1921), Scottish trade unionist and politician
George Henry Carson (1832–1901), merchant, road builder and city council member in Los Angeles, California